Iris Szeghy (born 1956) is a Slovak composer living in Switzerland.

Biography
Iris Szeghy was born in Prešov, Slovakia. She studied piano and composition at the Conservatory in Košice and composition at the Music Academy in Bratislava, she ended it with a doctoral degree at the same school. Szeghy went through numerous composer residencies - at the Akademie Schloss Solitude in Stuttgart, at the University of California at San Diego, at the STEIM Studio in Amsterdam, at the State Opera in Hamburg, at the Cité Internationale des Arts in Paris, she was a scholar of the Landis & Gyr Foundation in London and Budapest etc.

Iris Szeghy has won many international composition awards, her work has been performed and broadcast in Europe, America and Australia.

Works

Szeghy composes for orchestra, chamber ensembles and voice. Selected works include:

Hommage à Rodin - Touches with three Statues of the Master	1982
Musica Dolorosa (String Quartet) 1985
Minifanfare 1986
Canto Triste Nocturne for Trombone (Violoncello) and Piano	1986
Afforismi 1990
Afforismi II 1992
Midsummer Night's Mystery 1992
Midsummer Night's Mystery II 1993
Musica Folclorica - Hommage à Bartók 1996
A Day in Manhattan / Un Jour à Manhattan 1996
Un Petit Sentiment de Pojogne 1998
Poetic Studies / Poetische Studien	1984
Variations on a German Folk Song / Variationen über ein deutsches Volkslied 1995
It-Movements 2001
Afforismi III 1992
Streichtrio "Goldberg" / String trio "Goldberg" 2007
Choral 2008
Afforismi IV 2009
Neniae 2010
A Game / Ein Spiel	1985
Bekenntnisse / Confessions	1984 Choir a cappella
Three Shakespearean Songs	1990 Choir a cappella
War es so? / Was It Like That? 1985 Choir and solo instrument(s)
Frühlingskranz / Spring Wreath 1989 Choir and solo instrument(s)
Psalm 130 for Mixed Choir and Organ 1999 Choir and solo instrument(s)
Concerto for Violoncello and Orchestra 1989
Tableaux d´un parc	1999
Spring Sonata / Frühlingssonate 1984
Vivat Sommer / Vivat Summer! - Little Suite for Clarinet 1985
Suite Into Pocket / Suite de Poche	1986
Ciaccona 1991
Preludio e Danza für Bassklarinette oder Bassetthorn 1992
Canzona 1992
Perpetuum Mobile 1993
Wir gehen in den Zoo! / Let us go to Zoo! 1984
Bolero-Blues 2000
Canticum 2002
Slowakischer Tanz für Violine oder Violoncello 2006
Christmas Carol 2009
In Between	1993 Live and tape music
Story 1995 Live and tape music
Psalm eines Verhungerten / Psalm of a Starving Man	1988
The Prayer / La Preghiera / Ima 1998
Secret Love 1999
Psalm - for solo voice on a poem by Paul Celan 1993 Solo voice(s) a cappella
Oratio et Gratias Actio Pro Sanitate Matris Meae 1994 Solo voice(s) a cappella
Vivat Heidelberg! 1996 Solo voice(s) with ensemble
Vielleicht, dass uns etwas aufginge 2003 Solo voice(s) with orchestra
Simple and Difficult 1978 Solo voice(s) with solo instrument(s)
To You - 4 Love Songs from the Songs of Solomon 1983 Solo voice(s) with solo instrument(s)
De profundis - 4 songs for voice and 2 melodical instruments based on 4 poems by Michelangelo Buonarrotti 1990
Ave Maria - for solo voice and solo instruments 1992
When I Die 1999 Solo voice(s) with solo instrument(s)
Psalm 130 1999 Solo voice(s) with solo instrument(s)
Anrufung des Grossen Bären	2003 Solo voice(s) with solo instrument(s)
Hesse-Fragments - Cycle for Voice and Piano 2006
Musica Dolorosa 1985 String orchestra
Ad Parnassum für Strings Inspired by Pictures of Paul Klee	2005	String orchestra
Homewards 1997 Symphony orchestra

References

External links
 Music Centre Slovakia: Iris Szeghy Profile
 Works by Iris Szeghy
 Personal website

1956 births
Living people
20th-century classical composers
Women classical composers
Slovak composers
Hungarian composers
20th-century women composers